"Some Kind of Trouble" is a song written by Mike Reid, Brent Maher and Don Potter, and recorded by American country music artist Tanya Tucker.  It was released in February 1992 as the third single from the album What Do I Do with Me.  The song reached #3 on the Billboard Hot Country Singles & Tracks chart.

Charts

Weekly charts

Year-end charts

References

1992 singles
Tanya Tucker songs
Songs written by Mike Reid (singer)
Liberty Records singles
Songs written by Brent Maher
Song recordings produced by Jerry Crutchfield
1991 songs